Cotonopsis lafresnayi, common name the well-ribbed dovesnail, is a species of sea snail, a marine gastropod mollusk in the family Columbellidae, the dove snails.

Description
The size of the adult shell varies between 10 mm and 19 mm.

Distribution
This species is distributed in the North West Atlantic, the Gulf of Maine, the Caribbean Sea and the Lesser Antilles.

References

 Abbott, R.T. (1974). American Seashells. 2nd ed. Van Nostrand Reinhold: New York, NY (USA). 663 pp.
 Mayhew, R. and F. Cole. 1994 MS. A taxonomic discussion and update of shell-bearing marine molluscs recorded from NW Atlantic North of Cape Cod (excluding Greenland), and Canadian Arctic Archipeligo

External links
 

Columbellidae
Gastropods described in 1857